Euromast is an observation tower in Rotterdam, Netherlands, designed by Hugh Maaskant constructed between 1958 and 1960. It was specially built for the 1960 Floriade, and is a listed monument since 2010. For stability it is built on a concrete block of  so that the centre of gravity is below ground. Originally  in height it was the tallest building in Rotterdam. It lost this position to the high-rise of Erasmus MC which was completed in 1968, but regained it when the Space Tower was added to the top of the building in 1970, giving an additional . Euromast was the highest building of the Netherlands, but was surpassed by De Zalmhaven, also in Rotterdam, in 2021. It is also a member of the World Federation of Great Towers. In 2008, 2009 and 2019, the tower hosted an extreme sports event which featured BASE jumping. A new event was expected in September 2022.

See also
 List of towers
 Floriade 1960

References

External links

 
 Aerial photo (Google Maps)

Towers completed in 1960
Towers in Rotterdam
Tourist attractions in Rotterdam
Rijksmonuments in Rotterdam
Observation towers
Restaurant towers